Kelvin E. Butler is an American politician who is a Democratic member of the Mississippi Senate, representing the 38th District since 2004 to 2016, and from 2021 onward after he won a special election to replace Tammy Witherspoon.

Early life
Kevin Butler was born on August 8, 1956 in Magnolia, Mississippi.

Personal life
Kevin Butler practices the religion of Baptism. He is widowed and he has three children named Kelvin Jr., Kendric, and Destiny. Butler received his Associates at Meadow Draughon Business College in 1975.

Political Experience
Kevin Butler has had the following political experience:
Senator, Mississippi State Senate, 2004–2016, 2021–present
Candidate, Mississippi State House of Representatives, District 98, 1999
Alderman, City of Magnolia

Organizations
Kevin Butler has been a member of the following organizations:
Vice President, Operation Manhood Incorporated, 1999–present
Member, Magnolia South Pike Chamber of Commerce, 1995–present
Deacon, New Zion Baptist Church, 1994–present
Member, Masonic Lodge #234, 1990–present
Member, International Union of Electrical Workers, 1984–present
Coach, Dixie Youth Baseball, 1998-1999

References

External links
Mississippi State Senate - Kelvin E. Butler official government website
Project Vote Smart - Senator Kelvin E. Butler (MS) profile
Follow the Money - Kelvin E Butler
2007 2005 2003 1999 campaign contributions

African-American state legislators in Mississippi
Democratic Party Mississippi state senators
1956 births
Living people
People from Magnolia, Mississippi
21st-century African-American people
20th-century African-American people